The 1935 Dumfriesshire by-election was a by-election held for the British House of Commons constituency of Dumfriesshire in Scotland on 12 September 1935.  The by-election was won by the National Liberal Party candidate Sir Henry Fildes.

It was the last by-election of the 1931–1935 Parliament. Only six weeks later, on 25 October, Parliament was dissolved for the 1935 general election.

Vacancy 
The National Liberal MP Dr Joseph Hunter had died on 24 July 1935, aged 59. He had held the seat since the 1929 general election.

Candidates 
The parties in the National Government did not usually contest by-elections in seats held by other governing parties, so the National Liberal Party candidate Sir Henry Fildes did not face a Conservative opponent.

The only other candidate was J. Downie, Labour Co-operative.

Result 
On a reduced turnout, Fildes held the seat for the National Liberals, with a reduced but still large majority, taking over 60% of the votes. He was re-elected at the general election in November 1935, and held the seat until he stood down at the 1945 general election.

Votes 

 Note: Hunter left the Liberal Party and joined the National Liberal Party, in June 1934,  during the Parliament.

See also
Dumfriesshire (UK Parliament constituency)
Dumfriesshire
1963 Dumfriesshire by-election
List of United Kingdom by-elections (1931–1950)

References

Sources 
 
 

1935 elections in the United Kingdom
1935 in Scotland
1930s elections in Scotland
September 1935 events
Politics of Dumfries and Galloway
By-elections to the Parliament of the United Kingdom in Scottish constituencies